Uli Raysz is a retired West German slalom canoeist who competed in the mid-1960s. He won a bronze medal in the K-1 event at the 1965 ICF Canoe Slalom World Championships in Spittal.

References

German male canoeists
Living people
Year of birth missing (living people)
Medalists at the ICF Canoe Slalom World Championships